Kimio Yabuki is a Japanese animator. Known in Japan for his work on many early classic works by the Toei Animation studio, his best-known film in the West is Rainbow Brite and the Star Stealer from 1985, produced by the French-American company DiC with animation work done in Japan.

In 1969, he teamed up with a young Hayao Miyazaki in the production of an animated version of  Puss in Boots. Yabuki was an employee of Toei Animation until going freelance in 1973, but did work on several Toei productions (including Dororon Enma-kun, Ikkyu-san, and The Kabocha Wine) afterward.

Filmography

Director 
 1963–1965: Ōkami Shōnen Ken (狼少年ケン, Wolf Boy Ken; TV series)
 1968: Andersen Monogatari (アンデルセン物語)
 1969: Puss 'n Boots (長靴をはいた猫, Nagagutsu o Haita Neko)
 1973–1974: Dororon Enma-kun (ドロロンえん魔くん) 
 1975–1982: Ikkyū-san (一休さん)
 1980: Twelve Months (世界名作童話 森は生きている, Sekai Meisaku Dōwa Mori wa Ikiteiru)
 1981: Swan Lake
 1982–1984: The Kabocha Wine (Ｔｈｅかぼちゃワイン)
 1985: Rainbow Brite and the Star Stealer
 1988: Space Family Carlvinson (宇宙家族カールビンソン, Uchū Kazoku Carlvinson)

Writer 
 1984: Twelve Months (film)
 1989: The Jungle Book (TV series)

Assistant director 
 1963: The Little Prince and the Eight-Headed Dragon (わんぱく王子の大蛇退治, Wanpaku Ouji no Orochi Taiji)

References

External links
 
 

Japanese film directors
Japanese animated film directors
Japanese animators
Living people
Year of birth missing (living people)